Maski Assembly constituency is one of the 224 Legislative Assembly constituencies of Karnataka state in India.

It is part of Raichur district and is reserved for candidates belonging to the Scheduled Tribes.

Members of the Legislative Assembly

Election results

2021 by-poll

2018

2013

See also
 List of constituencies of the Karnataka Legislative Assembly
 Raichur district

References

Raichur district
Assembly constituencies of Karnataka